The following lists events that happened during 2009 in Republic of Albania.

Incumbents 
 President: Bamir Topi
 Prime Minister: Sali Berisha (re-elected)
 Deputy Prime Minister: Ilir Rusmali (until 10 September); Ilir Meta (from 10 September)

Events

April 
 2 April - Albania officially joins NATO and formally applies for membership of the European Union.

July
 Sali Berisha's centre-right Democratic Party wins parliamentary elections by a narrow margin.

November 
 Opposition Socialist Party begins series of demonstrations in Tirana in protest at alleged vote-rigging in the parliamentary election.

Deaths 
 24 March - Ali Progri, Albanian engineer
 14 July - Kujtim Majaci, Albanian football player
 21 November - Teki Biçoku, Albanian geologist and former member and president of the Academy of Sciences of Albania.

See also
 2009 in Albanian television

References

External links

 
Years of the 21st century in Albania
2000s in Albania